Waldleiningen is a municipality in the district of Kaiserslautern, in Rhineland-Palatinate, western Germany.

References

Municipalities in Rhineland-Palatinate
Palatinate Forest
Kaiserslautern (district)